Sopater may refer to:

Sopater, New Testament figure, the son of Pyrhus
Sopater (poet), author of at least 12 books of Eclogues, see Callixenus of Rhodes
Sopater of Apamea, 4th century sophist